Bašť is a municipality and village in Prague-East District in the Central Bohemian Region of the Czech Republic. It has about 2,900 inhabitants.

Geography
It lies mostly in the Central Bohemian Table, but the western part of the municipal territory extends into the Prague Plateau.

History
The first written mention of Bašť is from 1088, when King Vratislaus II donated the village to the Vyšehrad Chapter. The village used to be made up of two settlements, Velký Bášt and Malý Bášt (later named Bašť and Baštěk), which later urbanistically merged.

Demographics

Gallery

References

External links

Villages in Prague-East District